The Benin national U-20 football team is the youth football team of the Benin national football team. It participated in the 2013 African U-20 Championship in Algeria in 2013.

References

African national under-20 association football teams
under-20